Lynx Entertainment is a Ghanaian record label founded in 2006 by the producer and singer-songwriter Richie Mensah.

The label successfully launched the solo careers of the Ghanaian musicians Richie, ASEM, Irene Logan, OJ Blaq, Eazzy, Zigi, Jayla, MzVee,   KiDi, Kuami Eugene and DopeNation. Lynx Entertainment has also produced hit singles for several Ghanaian artistes including Tinny, Okyeame Kwame, VIP, Praye, Bradez, Irene and Jane, Obour, Becca, Reggie Rockstone, Efya, Trigmatic, Sonni Balli, EL, Jael Wiafe, Edem and Iwan.

In 2010, the label's artistes Richie, ASEM, OJ Blaq, Eazzy and Zigi collaborated on "Africa's Moment", which appeared on Hello Afrika, Sony Music's release in conjunction with the 2010 FIFA World Cup in South Africa.  The song was also used in the Vodafone advert which staged the first ever flashmob in West Africa.

Lynx Entertainment released Back 2 Zero in July 2011. The album has all of the artistes on the record label as well as renowned Ghanaian musicians such as Gyedu Blay-Ambolley, Tinny, V.I.P (group), Okyeame Kwame, Efya, Trigmatic, Sonniballi, EL, Jael Wiafe, Edem and Iwan. The album includes a remake of the Ghanaian folk song "Yen Ara Asase Ni" which was originally composed by Ephraim Amu. The remake has 11 of Ghana's top musicians and was adopted as a peace song before the 2012 general elections in Ghana.

The record label introduced a new girl band D3 to the Ghanaian music scene in summer 2012. The band, made up of three members aged 16, 19 and 20, released hit singles such as "Good Girls Gone Bad" and "Gyani Gyani". They split up at the end of 2013 because of educational commitments.

MzVee, the lead singer of the group, went on to launch a solo career under the management of Lynx Entertainment and quickly became a household name in Ghana. She won the Unsung Artiste Award at the 2014 Ghana Music Awards in May 2014 and released her first solo album, Reveelation, in November 2014. This was followed in November 2015 by her second album, Verified, and her third studio album, DaaVee, in May 2017.

Lynx Entertainment continues to nurture some of the biggest talents in afrobeats music like KiDi and Kuami Eugene and is regarded as one of the leading record labels in Africa.

Artistes

Discography

References

External links

African record labels